Aster pubescens may refer to three different species of plants:
 Aster pubescens Nees, a synonym for Symphyotrichum cordifolium (L.) G.L.Nesom
 Aster pubescens Moench, a synonym for  Pentanema spiraeifolium (L.) D.Gut.Larr. et al.
 Aster pubescens Lam., a synonym for Aster tataricus L.f.